Pasivadi Pranam is a 1987 Indian Telugu-language thriller film directed by A. Kodandarami Reddy, starring Chiranjeevi, Vijayashanti, Raghuvaran and Sujitha. The film was produced by Allu Aravind under Geetha Arts banner. It was a remake of the Malayalam film Poovinu Puthiya Poonthennal (1987).

Plot 
Madhu is presented as a painter who became a drunkard when his wife died in an accident immediately after their marriage. He leads a careless life until a deaf-mute child enters his life. He names him Raja and takes care of him. However, he continues to drink.

It is revealed that Raja's parents were murdered by Chakravarthy and his assistant Ranjith and Raja was a witness, and they are trying to get rid of him. Geeta meets them in a shopping centre and thinks Raja is Madhu's son. She fights with them when Raja accidentally breaks her just-purchased gift. She later realises her mistake and comes to Madhu's house to apologise. She befriends Raja and gradually falls for Madhu. Later she learns that Raja is her sister's son.

Chakravarthy and Ranjith keep trying to kill Raja and they are almost successful when Madhu is out drunk one night, but Madhu saves him in the last minute. This changes him and he gives up drinking. Madhu is accused of murder and kidnapping and is arrested by Inspector. Geeta and her father show Madhu is not the actual killer, but the police can't release him as another case was filed on him. The villains are slain and Madhu and Geetha marry and adopt Raja.

Cast 
 Chiranjeevi as Madhu
 Vijayashanti as Geeta
 Raghuvaran as Chakravarthy
 Babu Antony as Ranjith
 Sujitha as Raja
 Kannada Prabhakar as Inspector
 Brahmanandam
 Sumalatha as Madhu's wife [special appearance]
 Rajyalakshmi as Raja's mother
 Allu Ramalingaiah
 Jaggayya
 Gummadi
 Giribabu
 Prasad Babu
 P.J. Sarma

Soundtrack 
All songs were composed by K. Chakravarthy with lyrics written by Acharya Aatreya and Veturi. Vocals by S. P. Balasubrahmanyam, P. Susheela and S. Janaki.

Reception 

This movie was Chiranjeevi's first silver-jubilee hit. It had a 175-day run in Prathap theatre on five daily shows (still the record), in Tirupathi. In those days, a Telugu movie running in for more than 100 days with four daily shows was difficult due to the introduction of the slab system by AP State govt. In 1984. This film also surpassed another record that a Telugu movie has a run of 100 days with five shows per day in three centres (Tirupati, Nellore, Anathapur). Previously another Telugu movie ran in two centres (Tirupati, Anathapur). It became the first South Indian movie to be dubbed into Russian. It was released in more than 600 theatres in Russia. And there also it got tremendous success. After "Rajkapoor's movies" and Mithun Chakraborty's "Disco Dancer (1982)", it is the next Indian film and the first south Indian film to become a hit in Russia. Due to influence of this film, later Chiranjeevi and K.Viswanath's "Swayamkrushi" was also dubbed into Russian.

References

External links 

1980s crime thriller films
1980s mystery thriller films
1980s Telugu-language films
1987 films
Films directed by A. Kodandarami Reddy
Films scored by K. Chakravarthy
Geetha Arts films
Indian crime thriller films
Indian mystery thriller films
Telugu remakes of Malayalam films